Breathitt County High School (aka Breathitt High School) is a public high school located in the city of Jackson, Kentucky nestled in the Appalachian Mountains of Eastern Kentucky. The 2009-2010 enrollment is around 520 students. The school colors are royal blue and white. The current principal is Daphne Noble, and the current assistant principal is Bonnie Lively.

With about 70 certified staff, Breathitt County High offers a very wide range of courses leading to two separate diploma tracks. Students can receive a College Preparation Diploma or Technical Preparation Diploma. Both meet the stringent standards set forth by the Kentucky Department of Education.

History

Beginnings
The high school was established in 1927 in Quicksand, Kentucky, just south of the county seat of Jackson. Kentucky. It came about when in the office of the superintendent of Breathitt County and the Jackson City School board of education disagreed on ways of education and how it should be run. It was during that time that the county school children went to the city school (which is an independent school) since it was the only public high school in the county. Soon, the idea of building a county high school was born.

The county would use the Quicksand Common Grade School building that was donated to the county school system, in 1917, by Mr. E. O. Robinson, and F. W. Mowbray, the heads of the Mowbray and Robinson Company that was a major logging company that was the major employer for the boomtown. It would be known as Breathitt County High School, but many locals would sometimes call it Quicksand High School (due to its location, since not many high schools back then were known by the county name) or Breathitt High School (due to many reasons, but mainly because many high schools in the area back then only had three initials and not many schools existed as a unified county school with 'county' in its name). It was used so often and was so common that when the second building was constructed, they carved over top of the entrance "Breathitt High School" instead of "Breathitt County High School". Hence, why the name "Breathitt High School" still sticks to many locals today.

The first high school in Quicksand
The campus was located on a hill overlooking the town of Quicksand. It was set up much like a college campus with a boys' and girls' dormitory. These were needed during this time due to inefficient roads, lack of many motor vehicles, and the long travel it would take to go back and forth every day when most kids walked to school during this time. So, most kids would stay for the weekdays and go home for the weekends. There were five buildings on campus: 
 The main building - which housed the auditorium, the cafeteria, four classrooms, and the administrator's office.
 The boys' dormitory
 The girls' dormitory
 The gymnasium - which was located just behind the main building
 classroom building

The first year of its existence, consisting of 24 students and two faculty members, was headed by L. K. Rice as principal. Within its first year, it housed a boys' and girls' basketball team that competed in the KHSAA. There were 2 graduates for its first commencement. They were Roy Bach and Wayne Davis.

Enrollment and faculty continued to grow through the end of the decade and up into the 1930s despite the effects of The Great Depression. They gained many more extracurricular activities and classes over the years like music, boys' and girls' glee club, FFA, and much more.

The move to Jackson: the second high school
By the mid-1930s, the board of education knew the buildings were becoming inefficient to contain the rapid growth of the student body and faculty. So, in 1936, an  property was bought on Court Street and next to the North Fork of the Kentucky River in the City of Jackson. Building began immediately and was completed to be opened in September 1938. It was a two-story red brick building that had about 40 classrooms and a separate gymnasium with an auditorium that housed around 200 people. There was still a huge field behind the high school that could be used for sporting activities of recreation. The building was dedicated in January 1938 by First Lady Eleanor Roosevelt during her visit to the county. All this was due to the efforts from current Superintendent Marie Roberts-Turner and her fighting for better education to the children of Breathitt County. There were 46 graduates from the graduating class of the new high school (Class of 1939).

With a growing number of students due to the paving of many roads and bus transportation, more was added throughout the years. The high school added more buildings to its campus. These buildings included:
 Arts and Industrial Building - Housed the art room, band room, chorus room, and the industrial arts.
 Library Building - A two-story building that housed the Library and Study Hall
 Little Red School - an elementary school (grades k-8) that was originally built for the purpose of giving high school students a chance to teach, but the enrollment soon grew and more buildings grew as well.
 Breathitt Coliseum - Built in 1963 due to the overcrowding of the previous gymnasium. In fact, for a two or three years prior, the high school used Lees College's Van Meter Gym for games. It housed, not only the gym, but the ROTC, classrooms, and a stage for use of theatre. In 2000, it would be renamed Fairce O. Woods Coliseum  There is no air conditioning in that building, rather oversized ceiling fans. 
 Football field - built in 1977, a year after the first football team was organized at Breathitt County H.S.
 Baseball field - built around the 1960s. It would, eventually be flipped around due to the use of the field for football and the new football stadium.  In 2006, a new baseball and softball complex was built behind LBJ Elementary School.
 Carl D. Perkins Vocational Building - Built around 1969 as a means to increase vocational education. A second building was built later on. Both buildings are known as the Breathitt County Area Technology Center
 Greenhouse
 various small buildings

Soon, another entrance from Washington Avenue was built due to the oncoming of the new road. Kentucky State Highway 15. Washington Avenue connected to Highway 15.

Time takes its toll: the third high school
In the early 1980s, the administrators, staff, and community began to notice that age was beginning to take a toll on many buildings on the campus. Plus, Little Red Elementary had been consolidated with other schools to form L. B. J. Elementary and Sebastian Middle School that housed 7th and 8th grades. So it was decided to build a new high school. Many fought to keep the old brick high school because of its gleaming red beauty. It was even thought of moving the high school to another piece of property, but in the end, it was more convenient to keep the high school where it was at due to the domed gymnasium, vocational school, and recently built football field.

In 1980, construction began as the building would be built connecting to the Fairce O. Woods Coliseum. From the gym, it would be built outward as little by little, building disappeared. The original brick high school would be last to go. It was torn down in the middle of the academic year which caused some classes to move to alternative locations. Finally, the last remnants of the brick building would be removed and the rest of the new high school would be built. Students moved into the new building during the spring semester of 1982.

The new high school contained approximately 1,200 students. It had many modern classrooms and was two stories high. It contained:
 spacious classrooms
 new science labs
 a larger lunchroom with a full size kitchen
 conference room
 drafting room
 a new P.E. gymnasium that could be used as a practice facility and would eventually house volleyball. Also, it contained a second floor for practices and expansion seating. It contained a stage for theater, and boys' and girls' shower facilities.
 shop class
 FFA (Agriculture) room
 Chorus room (which would later be turned into the CAD and technology room. Chorus would be moved to the band room)
 Band Room
 home economics rooms
 two-level library
 front office and lobby

The new high school provided new things that many students had not seen before with the old high school. This would include a new, modern P.A. system, digital clocks in the hallways (which would be replaced in 2000), an elevator, and much more. This building is still the building in use today with the exception of a few differences due to renovations and changes.

Mascot, school colors, and school (fight) song
In the early days, Breathitt County High School's mascot was preferably known as the "Owls". It was not until the mid-1930s, just before the move to Jackson, they changed from Owls to the Bobcats. It has been allegedly said that the current mascot of "Bobcats" was adopted due to during after school time and after a basketball game they (ballplayers) would go to the store just down the hill in Quicksand and most players would buy Bobcat Candy. This was a popular brand of candy bars in the community at the time. It, eventually, stuck with the team and seemed to have a more intimidating sound than "Owls". And, would be adopted by the school as the official mascot.

Just like the mascot, the school colors are not the same as they were when the school was founded. In the beginning the school colors were purple and gold. Supposedly, they were "borrowed" from the neighboring high school and rival Jackson City School. The colors were only kept for a couple of years and were changed to red, white, and blue. Eventually (around the early 1930s), the red was dropped and the primary colors were just royal blue and white. The fact that they are royal blue and white instead of just blue and white was probably due to the rise of the University of Kentucky men's basketball program and Coach Adolph Rupp. Other variances that are still used include: LadyCats or Lady Bobcats, BatCats, VolleyCats, and Cats. There have been other variances that have been used and since been dropped like those of the sport at the front with "Cats" at the end. i.e. TrackCats or GolfCats. Most clubs/sports have been dropped and just use Bobcats or LadyCats. The only exception is that sometimes of Baseball (BatCats) and Volleyball (VolleyCats).

The School Song, sometimes called the Fight Song, is based on the University of Notre Dame's School Song. The melody is exactly the same as main melody of Notre Dame's School Song. The lyrics, of course, are not the same. It is uncertain who exactly came up with the lyrics or what year they were written. It's possible they were written in the 1930s or 1940s when basketball at the high school was rising in interest.

The lyrics go as follows:
We are the Bobcats of Breathitt High!
We are the fellows who do or die!
Let our Blue and White fly high,
all other colors we'll pass by!
O' Alma Mater, we'll praise your name,
we'll always keep your honor the same!
As we in our lives go marching onward to victory!
B! O! B! C! A! T! S! Bobcats, Bobcats, Go Bobcats!!!Sports
Breathitt County High School is known for its athletic programs, currently under the heading of Kyle Moore, Breathitt County Schools Athletic Director and Head Football Coach. 
The sports programs at BCHS include: Boys' Basketball, Girls' Basketball, Football, Baseball, Fast Pitch Softball, Track and Field, Golf, Volleyball, Tennis, Cross Country, and even Cheerleading.

Football
In 1975, it was decided that the high school would field a football team due to the ongoing popularity in the region and the rising student body. At the time, there was a field and no stadium to play. So, most games were played during the day and people stood and watched or sat on buses or vehicles. The next year, it was agreed to build a stadium for fans to enjoy the game and, due to the construction, most games except two had to be played away. These home games were played at the local National Guard Amory.
It wasn't long until Breathitt County became a powerhouse in 3A.  With their first undefeated season coming 1978. In 1995, due to low student enrollment, they moved down to AA and became dominant of the class. 
The football Bobcats have won the KHSAA Class AA State Championships in 1995, 1996, and 2002. During the time frame from 1995 to 1997 they boasted a winning streak of 42 games without a defeat. Going undefeated in 1995 and 1996. They had also had another undefeated season in 2002. In 2008, the Bobcats were KHSAA Class AAA Runners-Up.

The head coach is Kyle Moore.

The stadium is the Mike Holcomb Athletic Complex. This newer stadium replaced the old Breathitt Stadium built-in 1976. Constructed in 1998 and is one of few stadiums in the State of Kentucky to have a roof to cover spectators. According to KHSAA's website, it holds approximately 6,000 people. It has also been dubbed the nicknamed "The Riverbank" due to its location at the banks of the North Fork of the Kentucky River and the drainage of Panbowl Lake which once was part of the river.

Boys' basketball
The boys' basketball varsity basketball team has a long line of standing tradition. The high school has always had a boys' basketball team ever since the founding of the school that started in 1927. They have won twelve regional championships and countless district championships. Many contribute to the golden years of the 1950s and 1960s with coach Fairce O. Woods. Due to his many years of success, he was elected to the KHSAA Hall of Fame. The gymnasium (which is a circular domed arena) once called Breathitt Coliseum was renamed in 2000 after him (Breathitt Coliseum built in 1963, now Fairce O. Woods Coliseum - 2000).

Girls' basketball
The first girls' team started the same year as the school's founding and lasted up until after the 1931–1932 season when the KHSAA discontinued girls' basketball in high school. The prevailing thought at the time was that the game was too strenuous an activity for females. In 1975, KHSAA revived girls' basketball and it didn't take long for the school to hire a coach and start a varsity team once more.

The girls' team has made it to the KHSAA Sweet Sixteen Finals in 1978, only to be runners-up to Laurel County H.S. (Now split into North Laurel and South Laurel H.S.). Irene (Moore) Strong would be crowned Kentucky "Miss Basketball" this year, as well.

The Ladycats, in recent years, made a run of regional titles.  They won the 14th Regional Tournament four times in a row up to 2010 (2006–07, 2007–08, 2008–09, 2009–10).

Extracurriculars
Breathitt County High School has a variety of extracurricular activities available to students including several clubs to join, of which Future Farmers of America is the oldest club in existence, founded the same year the school was opened in 1927.

Other extracurricular activities (non-sports)include:

 Academic Team
 HOSA
 Band - Marching Band, Pep Band, Concert Band
 JROTC
 Future Farmers of America
 Future Business Leaders of America
 Teens For Christ
 National Honor Society
 FCCLA
 Journalism
 Science Club
 STOP Club
 French Club
 Gifted and Talented

Breathitt County Area Technology Center
Located on the Breathitt County High School campus, Breathitt County Area Technology Center is a vocational school where students can receive college credit and work in areas such as electricity, automotive technology, health services, construction, desktop publishing, and web design. Consisting of two buildings, the area technology center provides services to all local high schools, including Jackson High School, Riverside Christian High School, Oakdale Vocational High School and Mount Carmel High School.

Administration
This is a list of the administration as of December 2020.
Phillip Watts - Superintendent 
Charles Davidson - Principal
Daphne Noble - Assistant Principal
Betty Maggard - Guidance Counselor
Patricia Gross - Book Keeping/Secretary/Receptionist

Notable alumni

Jeffrey Reddick, screenwriter, actor, film producer, and the creator of the Final Destination'' franchise.
Mary Noble, attorney and Justice of the Kentucky Supreme Court.

Jacob Couch, Jiu Jitsu Practitioner, also known as the "Hillbilly Hammer".

References

External links
Official website

Schools in Breathitt County, Kentucky
Public high schools in Kentucky